Michel Ndoumbé (born 1 February 1971) is a Cameroonian former professional footballer who played as a defender.

References

External links
 Profile at magyarfutball.hu
 Profile at uslleaguetwo.com
 

Living people
1971 births
Association football defenders
Cameroonian footballers
Elite One players
American Professional Soccer League players
Nemzeti Bajnokság I players
A-League (1995–2004) players
Diamant Yaoundé players
Union Douala players
Los Angeles Salsa players
Újpest FC players
FC VSS Košice players
Orange County Blue Star players
San Diego Flash players
Cameroon international footballers
1996 African Cup of Nations players
Expatriate soccer players in the United States
Cameroonian expatriate sportspeople in the United States
Expatriate footballers in Hungary
Cameroonian expatriate sportspeople in Hungary
Expatriate footballers in Slovakia
Cameroonian expatriate sportspeople in Slovakia